Common Course was a political party in Denmark, which held 4 seats in the Danish parliament from 1987–1988.

History
Common Course was officially founded in 1986, but it was built on several factions of the Communist Party of Denmark which were planning for the emergence of a new party as early as 1979. The party's leader was Preben Møller Hansen, writer, cook, and leader of the Danish Seamens' Union, who was expelled from the Communist Party of Denmark in 1979. He was known for his outspoken way of expressing himself, frequently using swear words, making broad generalizations and anti-elitist statements. The party itself gathered both communists and left-wing socialists, united in an inveterate struggle against Denmark's membership of the European Communities. The party's official immigration policy was quite restrictive, contrary to other parties on the left. It actively supported communist regimes in the Soviet Union, Cuba, and North Korea, as well as Colonel Muammar al-Gaddafi in Libya, and was a collective member of organisations supporting these nations.
 
In the 1988 parliamentary election, the party achieved 1.9% of the votes, thereby failing to pass the 2% election threshold. In an attempt to regain parliamentary representation, Common Course started cooperating with Mogens Glistrup's right-wing Progress Party, causing many members to desert. The attempt failed, the party was dissolved in 2001, and members were recommended to join the Communist Party of Denmark instead (which later merged into the Red-Green Alliance in 1991).

Former member of Danish parliament Line Barfod (Red-Green Alliance) was a former member of Common Course, and was chairperson of its youth wing in the years 1984–1985, before the actual formation of the party.

References

1986 establishments in Denmark
2001 disestablishments in Denmark
Defunct communist parties in Denmark
Eurosceptic parties in Denmark
Political parties established in 1986
Political parties disestablished in 2001
Syncretic political movements